The Scotland Act 1998 (c. 46) is an Act of the Parliament of the United Kingdom which legislated for the establishment of the devolved Scottish Parliament with tax varying powers and the Scottish Government (then Scottish Executive). It was one of the most significant constitutional pieces of legislation to be passed by the UK Parliament between the passing of the European Communities Act in 1972 and the  European Union (Withdrawal) Act in 2018 and is the most significant piece of legislation to affect Scotland since the Acts of Union in 1707 which ratified the Treaty of Union and led to the disbandment of the Parliament of Scotland.

Content and history
The Act was introduced by the Labour government in 1998 to give effect to the Scottish devolution referendum in 1997 which showed that Scotland was in favour of both of the set questions, firstly for the creation of a parliament for Scotland and secondly, that this parliament should have tax varying powers.   The Act creates the Scottish Parliament, sets out how Members of the Scottish Parliament are to be elected, makes some provision about the internal operation of the Parliament (although many issues are left for the Parliament itself to regulate) and sets out the process for the Parliament to consider and pass Bills which become Acts of the Scottish Parliament once they receive royal assent. The Act specifically declares the continued power of the UK Parliament to legislate in respect of Scotland; thereby upholding the concept of Westminster's absolute Parliamentary sovereignty.

The Act also provides for the creation of a 'Scottish Executive' though one of the early actions of the SNP administration that won power in the 2007 elections was to rebrand the Scottish Executive, as the group of Ministers and their civil servants had been known, as the Scottish Government. Despite the re-branding, the 'Scottish Executive' still uses the original description for a number of purposes (s.44 of the Scotland Act defines the nature of the body but does not use the words "shall be known as" with regard to a name as is the case with various other bodies whose names are thus fixed by statute). It consists of a First Minister and other Ministers appointed by the Monarch with the approval of the Parliament, including the Lord Advocate and the Solicitor General for Scotland.

The Act sets out the legislative competence of the Scottish Parliament. Rather than listing the matters over which the Scottish Parliament does control (devolved powers), it specifies the matters over which it does not (reserved matters). It further designates a list of statutes which are not amenable to amendment or repeal by the Parliament which includes the Human Rights Act 1998 and many provisions of the Scotland Act itself. Even when acting within its legislative competence, the Act further constrains the powers of the Parliament by inhibiting it from acting in a manner incompatible with the European Convention on Human Rights or European Community law. The same constraints apply to acts of the Scottish Executive.

The Act grants the Secretary of State for Scotland power to direct the Scottish Government not to take any action which he has reasonable grounds to believe "would be incompatible with any international obligations" or to act where he believes such action "is required for the purpose of giving effect to any such obligations".

The Act also sets up mechanisms to resolve disputes over questions about legislative competence of the Parliament and powers of the Executive. The ultimate appeal in such matters lies to the Supreme Court of the United Kingdom (prior to 1 October 2009, the Judicial Committee of the Privy Council). In exceptional circumstances, the Westminster government can prohibit an Act of the Scottish Parliament — even if legislatively competent — from receiving royal assent if it believes the law would affect matters of reserved law; this provision has been only used once, to veto the Gender Recognition Reform (Scotland) Bill in 2023.

The Act also allows the powers of the Scottish Parliament and the Scottish Executive to be adjusted over time by agreement between both Parliaments by means of an Order in Council.

The Act was passed on 17 November 1998, and received royal assent two days later on 19 November.  The first elections were held in May 1999 and the Scottish Parliament and Executive assumed their full powers on 1 July 1999.

Amendments to the Act
The Act was amended by the Scottish Parliament (Constituencies) Act 2004 to end the link between the number of MPs at Westminster and the number of constituency MSPs. It was amended again in 2016 as a reaction to the 2014 Scottish Independence vote.

The Wales Act 2014 made amendments to Part 4A of the Scotland Act around the definition of a Scottish taxpayer, to ensure that an individual could not be a taxpayer in both Scotland and Wales in the same year.

The Act has been amended by:
Scottish Parliament (Constituencies) Act 2004
Constitutional Reform Act 2005 
Scotland Act 2012
Wales Act 2014
Scotland Act 2016
European Union (Withdrawal) Act 2018

See also
2014 Scottish independence referendum – Scottish referendum bill 2010
Government of Wales Act 1998
Royal Commission on the Constitution (United Kingdom)

References

Further reading
  Walker,  Graham. "Scotland, Northern Ireland, and Devolution, 1945–1979," Journal of British Studies Jan. 2010, Vol. 49, No. 1: 117–142.

External links

browse legislation that exclusively or primarily applies to Scotland on legislation.gov.uk
Scottish Parliament site
Scottish Government site

Scottish devolution
United Kingdom Acts of Parliament 1998
Constitutional laws of Scotland
Acts of the Parliament of the United Kingdom concerning Scotland
1998 in Scotland
November 1998 events in the United Kingdom